Karle Carder-Andrews (born 13 March 1989), sometimes known as Karle Carder or Karle Andrews, is an English semi-professional footballer who plays as a midfielder. Carder-Andrews began his career in the Football League with Brentford, before dropping into non-league football upon his release in 2008.

Club career

Brentford 
A midfielder, Carder-Andrews began his career in the Centre Of Excellence at Brentford in 2002. He was part of a Brentford youth team which beat Arsenal in the third round of the 2004–05 FA Youth Cup.

Carder-Andrews signed his first professional contract in August 2006 and received his maiden call into the first team squad for a League One match versus Leyton Orient on 9 September 2006. He made his professional debut when he replaced Karleigh Osborne after 66 minutes of the 1–1 draw. Carder-Andrews continued to receive calls into the first team squad throughout September and October and made his first start in a Football League Trophy first round match against Northampton Town on 17 October. He played the full 120 minutes of the shootout win. Following the sacking of manager Leroy Rosenior and the appointment of Scott Fitzgerald in November 2006, Carder-Andrews managed just two more substitute appearances during the 2006–07 season, which ended with the Bees suffering relegation to League Two. Carder-Andrews made six appearances during the 2006–07 season.

Under new manager Terry Butcher, Carder-Andrews failed to receive a call into the first team squad during the 2007–08 season and was released on 11 January 2008 by Butcher's replacement, Andy Scott. He made six appearances during his 18 months as a professional.

Margate (loan) 
Carder-Andrews joined Isthmian League Premier Division club Margate on a one-month loan on 22 September 2007. He returned to Brentford when his loan expired, after making six appearances for Margate.

Egham Town 
Following a break from football, Carder-Andrews signed for Combined Counties League Premier Division club Egham Town in August 2008. He made 40 appearances during the 2008–09 season and scored one goal. The Sarnies found their form in the 2009–10 season, finishing fourth, with Carder-Andrews making 28 appearances and scoring two goals. A mid-table season followed in 2010–11, with Carder-Andrews making 31 appearances and scoring two goals. He departed the club in October 2011, having made 99 appearances and scored five goals during just over three years at the Runnymede Stadium.

Hampton & Richmond Borough 
Carder-Andrews signed for Conference South club Hampton & Richmond Borough in October 2011. He made 25 appearances and scored one goal during the 2011–12 season, but despite winning the 2011–12 Middlesex Senior Cup, the Beavers suffered relegation to the Isthmian League Premier Division. Carder-Andrews committed to the club for the 2012–13 season by signing a new contract in June 2012. Carder-Andrews made only 8 senior appearances during the 2012–13 season before departing in February 2013, due to budget concerns and a lack of game time.

Later career 
Between 2013 and 2016, Carder-Andrews moved around the Isthmian and Combined Counties Leagues and played for Chipstead, Sandhurst Town, Bedfont & Feltham, Cove, in addition to a second spell with Hampton & Richmond Borough. He joined Combined Counties League Premier Division club Westfield (Surrey) in April 2016 and helped the team win promotion to the Isthmian League South Central Division during the 2017–18 season. Carder-Andrews dropped back down to the Combined Counties League Premier Division to join Hanworth Villa in December 2018, with whom he remained until the 2019–20 season was curtailed by the COVID-19 pandemic. Carder-Andrews returned to football with Combined Counties League Premier Division South club Farnham Town in December 2021.

Career statistics

Honours 
Hampton & Richmond Borough
 Middlesex Senior Cup: 2011–12
Bedfont & Feltham
 Combined Counties League First Division Cup: 2014–15

Westfield (Surrey)

 Combined Counties League Premier Division: 2017–18

References

External links 

 
 Karle Carder-Andrews at ftfconline.com

1989 births
Living people
Association football midfielders
Brentford F.C. players
Margate F.C. players
Egham Town F.C. players
Hampton & Richmond Borough F.C. players
Chipstead F.C. players
Sandhurst Town F.C. players
English Football League players
National League (English football) players
Isthmian League players
Bedfont & Feltham F.C. players
Cove F.C. players
Westfield F.C. (Surrey) players
People from Feltham
Hanworth Villa F.C. players
English footballers